Orchestra Luna was an American rock and roll band of the 1970s who had two incarnations, the first producing a hard-to-categorize mixture of cabaret, Broadway musicals, and rock, and the second a somewhat more traditional mix of pop and rock. Rick Berlin, at the time using his birth name of Richard Kinscherf, composed most of their songs, sang, and played keyboards. Rick was the driving force of the band and is the only person who was a member in all the various lineups.

On their eponymous debut album Orchestra Luna, the band consisted of:

Richard Kinscherf - Keyboards, Vocals
Lisa Kinscherf - Vocals
Liz Gallagher - Vocals
Scott Chambers - Bass, Vocals
Randy Roos - Guitars
Don Mulvaney - Drums, Percussion, Vocals
 Peter Barrett - Narration, Vocals

The second major version of the band included:

Richard Kinscherf - Keyboards, Vocals
Liz Gallagher - Vocals
Peter Barrett - Vocals
Karla DeVito - Vocals
Steven Paul Perry - Guitar
Chet Cahill - Bass
Bob Brandon - Keyboards
Ace Holleran - Drums (August, 1976 to May 1977)
Erik Engstrom - Drums (May, 1997 through early 1978)
Joe Petruzzelli - Drums (early 1978 to the end)

Luna (band)

After Orchestra Luna, some of its former members formed the band Luna as a new American rock and roll band. It was spearheaded by Rick Berlin from  Orchestra Luna. In 1977, the band released the single "Hollywood" with B-side as "Dumb Love". Band members were:

Rick Berlin - Keyboards, Vocals
Steven Paul Perry - Guitar
Chet Cahill - Bass
Bob Brandon - Keyboards
Joe Petruzzelli - Drums

It disbanded after two years.

Discography

Orchestra Luna is the eponymous debut album by the American rock group Orchestra Luna. It was released in 1974 by Epic Records. The first incarnation of Orchestra Luna produced music often called a mixture of cabaret, Broadway musical, and rock, and that is clearly evident on this album. Composer/singer/pianist Rick Berlin is listed on the album under his birthname Richard Kinscherf. Kinscherf relates the story of his band in the booklet accompanying the 2007 CD reissue of the album by Market Square Records.

Track listing
All songs by Richard Kinscherf, except where noted.
"Were You Dancin' on Paper" (F. Reitano) – 3:34	
"Miss Pamela" – 3:17
"Little Sam" – 3:12
"Heart" (Richard Adler, Jerry Ross) – 5:54
"Love Is Not Enough" – 6:25	
"Boy Scouts" – 2:24	
"Fay Wray" – 4:18	
"But One" – 3:02	
"Doris Dreams" – 11:53

Credits
Richard Kinscherf – Keyboards, vocals
Lisa Kinscherf – Vocals
Liz Gallagher – Vocals
Scott CHambers – Bass, Vocals
Randy Roos – Guitars
Don Mulvaney – drums, percussion, Vocals
Peter Barrett – Narration, Vocals

External links
Rick Berlin's home page
Steven Paul Perry's home page
Unterzuber.com fan site

Rock music groups from Massachusetts
Musical groups from Boston